Japan has submitted films for the Academy Award for Best International Feature Film since the inception of the award. The award is handed out annually by the United States Academy of Motion Picture Arts and Sciences to a feature-length motion picture produced outside the United States that contains primarily non-English dialogue.

The Academy Award for Best International Feature Film was not created until 1956; however, between 1947 and 1955, the academy presented Honorary Awards to the best foreign language films released in the United States. These awards were not competitive, as there were no nominees but simply a winner every year that was voted on by the Board of Governors of the academy. Three Japanese films were recipients of Honorary Awards during this period. For the 1956 Academy Awards, a competitive Academy Award of Merit, known as the Best Foreign Language Film Award, was created for non-English speaking films, and has been given annually since.

, twelve Japanese films have been nominees for Academy Award for Best International Feature Film, and two films, Departures and Drive My Car, have won the award. The only Japanese directors to have multiple films be nominated for the award are Akira Kurosawa and Noboru Nakamura. Kurosawa received an Honorary Award prior to the inception of the formal award for his work on Rashomon and the actual Academy Award for Dersu Uzala (submitted for the former Soviet Union), and had four other films submitted, with two of them accepted as nominees. Notably, Kurosawa's 1985 film Ran was deliberately not nominated by the Japanese film industry for the Academy Award for Best Foreign Film due to the poor perception he had among Japanese filmmakers at the time. Nakamura had two films, Twin Sisters of Kyoto and Portrait of Chieko, submitted as nominees for the award. Among all the countries that have submitted films for the award, Japan ranks fourth in terms of total nominees, ahead of both Sweden (fourteen nominees) and the former Soviet Union (nine nominees).

Submissions
Every year, each country is invited by the Academy of Motion Picture Arts and Sciences to submit its best film for the Academy Award for Best International Feature Film. The International Feature Film Award Committee oversees the process and reviews all the submitted films. Following this, they vote via secret ballot to determine the five nominees for the award. Before the award was created, the Board of Governors of the academy voted on a film every year that was considered the best foreign language film released in the United States, and there were no submissions. Below is a list of the films that have been submitted by Japan for review by the academy for the award since its inception.

All Japanese submissions were in Japanese.

See also
List of Academy Award winners and nominees for Best International Feature Film
List of Academy Award-winning foreign language films
Cinema of Japan

Notes

References
General

Specific

External links
The Official Academy Awards Database
The Motion Picture Credits Database
IMDb Academy Awards Page

Japan
Academy Award for Best Foreign Language Film